Kaupitherium is an extinct dugongid sea cow that lived during the Oligocene. Fossils of the genus have been found in the Alzey Formation of Germany. Inside its flippers were finger bones that did not stick out. Kaupitherium also had the residues of back legs, which did not show externally. However, it did have a basic femur, joined to a reduced pelvis. Kaupitherium also had elongated ribs, presumably  to increase lung capacity to provide fine control of buoyancy.

Taxonomy
"Halitheriine" dugongid remains from Oligocene deposits in Europe were previously referred to Halitherium schinzii by many authors. However, Voss (2013, 2014) dismissed Halitherium as a nomen dubium by virtue of being based on non-diagnostic remains. Voss based the opinion on the type species, H. schinzii, being nomen dubium, with its holotype fossil, an isolated molar, having no diagnostic value. and a 2017 study found specimens traditionally assigned to Halitherium schinzii to be two separate species, one of which takes the name Halitherium bronni Krauss, 1858. Because Halitherium is dubious, the dugongid remains traditionally known as Halitherium were given the new genus Kaupitherium.

Related species 
 Metaxytherium
 Rytiodus

See also 
 Evolution of sirenians

References

Bibliography 
 Marine Mammals: Evolutionary Biology by Annalisa Berta, James L. Sumich, and Kit M. Kovacs 
 The Beginning of the Age of Mammals by Kenneth D. Rose 
 Classification of Mammals by Malcolm C. McKenna and Susan K. Bell

Oligocene sirenians
Rupelian life
Oligocene mammals of Europe
Paleogene Germany
Fossils of Germany
Fossil taxa described in 2017
Prehistoric placental genera